Neotrombicula is a genus of mites in the family Trombiculidae. Species of this genus are found throughout Europe and North America.

Species
BioLib includes:
 Neotrombicula absoluta Schluger, 1966
 Neotrombicula acomys (Radford, 1957)
 Neotrombicula aeretes Hsu & Yang, 1985
 Neotrombicula agriotricha Stekolnikov, 1994
 Neotrombicula alexandrae Stekolnikov, 1993
 Neotrombicula anthiana Kolebinova, 1969
 Neotrombicula arcuata Wen & Jiang, 1984
 Neotrombicula austriaca Kepka, 1964
 Neotrombicula autumnalis (Shaw, 1790)
 Neotrombicula balcanica Kolebinova, 1973
 Neotrombicula baschkirica Kudryashova, 1998
 Neotrombicula bisignata (Ewing, 1929)
 Neotrombicula bondari Kudryashova, 1994
 Neotrombicula boroveza Vercammen-Grandjean, Kolebinova, Göksu & Kepka, 1971
 Neotrombicula carpathica Schluger & Vysotzkaja, 1970
 Neotrombicula centrafricana Goff, 1995
 Neotrombicula comata Domrow, 1961
 Neotrombicula corvi Kolebinova, 1971
 Neotrombicula desaleri (Methlagl, 1927)
 Neotrombicula digenuala Schluger, 1967
 Neotrombicula ditricha (Feider, 1955)
 Neotrombicula earis Kepka, 1964
 Neotrombicula elegans Schluger, 1966
 Neotrombicula elegantissima Kolebinova, 1981
 Neotrombicula faghihi Kudryashova, 1973
 Neotrombicula fujigmo 
 Neotrombicula gemini Domrow, 1971
 Neotrombicula georgyi Kharadov, 1990
 Neotrombicula greenlyi Domrow, 1984
 Neotrombicula inopinata (Oudemans, 1909)
 Neotrombicula japonica (Tanaka, Kaiwa, Teramura & Kagaya, 1930)
 Neotrombicula kenyaensis Goff, 1995
 Neotrombicula kepkai Kolebinova, 1971
 Neotrombicula marmotae Wen, Zhou, Chen, Wang & Zhang, 1984
 Neotrombicula microti (Ewing, 1928)
 Neotrombicula minuta Schluger, 1966
 Neotrombicula nagayoi (Sasa, Hayashi, Saito, Minura & Asahina, 1950)
 Neotrombicula naultini (Dumbleton, 1947)
 Neotrombicula novaehollandiae (Hirst, 1929)
 Neotrombicula palestinensis (Radford, 1957)
 Neotrombicula pentagona (Womersley, 1952)
 Neotrombicula pilosa (Feider, 1948)
 Neotrombicula pomeranzevi (Schluger, 1948)
 Neotrombicula pontica Stekolnikov, 2001
 Neotrombicula rhinolophi Kolebinova, 1968
 Neotrombicula rhodesiana (Lawrence, 1949)
 Neotrombicula richmondi (Brennan & Wharton, 1950)
 Neotrombicula rissa Kudryashova, 1998
 Neotrombicula sciuricola Kolebinova, 1970
 Neotrombicula serbovae Kolebinova, 1972
 Neotrombicula sphenodonti Goff, Loomis & Ainsworth, 1988
 Neotrombicula subtilis Schluger & Kudryashova, 1969
 Neotrombicula talmiensis (Schluger, 1955)
 Neotrombicula thylogale (Womersley, 1954)
 Neotrombicula tragardhiana (Feider, 1953)
 Neotrombicula uliginosa Kudryashova, 1998
 Neotrombicula uraliensis Kudryashova, 1994
 Neotrombicula vernalis (Willmann, 1942)
 Neotrombicula villosa Kudryashova, 1994
 Neotrombicula vulgaris (Schluger, 1955)

References

External links

Trombiculidae
Arachnids of North America
Arachnids of Europe